Macarthur Avenue is a light rail station on the Canberra Metro R1 Civic to Gungahlin line, located at the intersection of Northbourne Avenue, Macarthur Avenue and Wakefield Avenue. This is a major intersection bordering the suburbs of Dickson, Braddon, Turner and Lyneham. Priority for light rail vehicles arriving and departing from the station has increased traffic congestion for vehicles waiting to cross Northbourne Avenue since the line began operating. The station provides bicycle racks, however there are no "kiss and ride" or dedicated parking areas for commuters.

The station has been identified by the ACT Government as the centre of a future "urban hub", with the surrounding blocks zoned to allow mixed-use redevelopment, more active street frontages and better pedestrian amenities. Prior to completion of the line, Northbourne House, a former office building was repurposed as a Mantra hotel.

Light rail services
There are no local bus connections available, however all light rail services in both directions stop at this station.

References

Railway stations in Australia opened in 2019
Light rail stations in Canberra